St. John's Episcopal Church in Fayetteville, North Carolina is a congregation of the Episcopal Diocese of East Carolina, a division of the Episcopal Church in the United States of America.  Founded in 1817, it is located on Green Street in historic downtown Fayetteville.  The congregation was formally organized April 7, 1817, and it became the first Episcopal church in the city.  It is listed in the National Register of Historic Places.  Public tours are available by appointment.

History

Organization
When the city was founded, Fayetteville's Episcopalian families had no congregation of their own.  Because the town's population was mainly of Scottish descent, Episcopalians typically worshiped together with the Presbyterians.  In 1816, John Winslow went to Wilmington to consult the Rev. Dr. Bethell Judd, and the following year St. John's Episcopal Church was founded in Fayetteville.  The Rev. Dr. Judd became the church's first rector.

Original church
The foundations of the original church building were laid in 1817 by the local chapter of the Masonic Order.  The church had a single spire which housed the town clock, and the total cost was about $16,000.  In 1831 the Great Fire destroyed the church building, along with hundreds of other historic downtown sites.

Current building and recent renovations
The current church was constructed in 1832.  The main church, which has a seating capacity of over 400 people, features stained glass windows from Munich, Germany depicting Biblical scenes.  The Chapel of the Beloved Disciple provides a more intimate setting for smaller services.  In 1990, St. John's purchased the Kyle House, a 139-year-old home adjacent to the church which is often used for receptions, classes, and meetings.  In 2002, the parish dedicated a building project which connected the original church structure to the Kyle House.  The project also included the addition of a gymnasium, a pre-school facility, and an expanded fellowship hall.

Rectors
St. John's has had nineteen rectors since its organization.

 The Rev. Bethel Judd (1817–1818)
 The Rev. Gregory T. Bedell (1818–1822)
 The Rev. William Hooper (1822–1824)
 The Rev. Henry M. Mason (1825–1827)
 The Rev. Philip B. Wiley (1828–1830)
 The Rev. William G. H. Jones (1830-1831)
 The Rev. Jarvis B. Buxton (1831–1851)
 The Rev. Joseph Caldwell Huske (1851–1888)
 The Rev. Thomas Atkinson, Jr. (1888–1893)
 The Rev. Isaac Wayne Hughes (1894–1909)
 The Rev. Charles Tyndall (1910–1912)
 The Rev. Archie Boogher (1912–1938)
 The Rev. Tate Young (1938–1942)
 The Rev. J. F. Ferneyhough (1943–1954)
 The Rev. Roscoe C. Hauser, Jr. (1954–1974)
 The Rev. Robert L. Ladehoff (1974–1985)
 The Rev. David M. Chamberlain (1987–2002)
 The Rev. Louanne Mabry-Loch (2003–2007)
 The Rev. Robert M. Alves (2009-present)

Worship
The Eucharist is always at the center of worship at St. John's.  The church generally has a Broad Church to High Church style of worship, with the vast majority of services following a formal, traditional format.  Both the Rite I and the Rite II forms of worship from the Book of Common Prayer are used.  St. John's recently began a contemporary service on Wednesday evenings.

Preschool
St. John's also operates a nondenominational, Christian preschool for children ages 6 months through four years of age.  The preschool is in its ninth year of operation.

See also

 National Register of Historic Places listings in Cumberland County, North Carolina

References

External links

 St. John's Episcopal Church website

Churches completed in 1832
19th-century Episcopal church buildings
Churches in Fayetteville, North Carolina
Episcopal church buildings in North Carolina
Carpenter Gothic church buildings in North Carolina
Churches on the National Register of Historic Places in North Carolina
Religious organizations established in 1817
1817 establishments in North Carolina
National Register of Historic Places in Cumberland County, North Carolina